Robin D. Leach (September 21, 1939–June 16, 2012) was an American politician who served as a Democratic member of the Kansas House of Representatives, from 1977 to 1988.

References

1939 births
2012 deaths
Democratic Party members of the Kansas House of Representatives
People from Leavenworth County, Kansas
20th-century American politicians
Politicians from Lawrence, Kansas